Dichomeris christophi is a moth in the family Gelechiidae. It was described by Ponomarenko and Mey in 2002. It is found in Japan and the Russian Far East.

References

Moths described in 2002
christophi